Honeymoon Flats is a 1928 American silent comedy film directed by Millard Webb and starring George J. Lewis, Dorothy Gulliver and Kathlyn Williams.

Synopsis
Disappointed that her daughter has not married into money, a mother attempts to make her daughter fed-up with life in her new marital homes - a cheap housing development known as Honeymoon Flats.

Cast
 George J. Lewis as Jim Clayton  
 Dorothy Gulliver as Lila Garland  
 Kathlyn Williams as Mrs. Garland  
 Ward Crane as Anthony Weir  
 Bryant Washburn as Tom Twitchell  
 Phillips Smalley as Mr. Garland  
 Jane Winton as Jane Twitchell  
 Patricia Caron as Mrs. French  
 Eddie Phillips as Mr. French  
 Betty Jane Graham as Cupid

References

Bibliography
 Munden, Kenneth White. The American Film Institute Catalog of Motion Pictures Produced in the United States, Part 1. University of California Press, 1997.

External links

1928 films
1928 comedy films
Silent American comedy films
Films directed by Millard Webb
American silent feature films
1920s English-language films
Universal Pictures films
American black-and-white films
Films with screenplays by Joseph F. Poland
1920s American films